Zurita may refer to:
 Zurita, Cantabria, a village in Cantabria, Spain
 Zurita (surname), a surname (and list of people with the surname)

it:Zurita